The 1999 WTA German Open singles  was the singles event of the fifty-fifth edition of the tennis tournament played at Berlin, Germany, the most prestigious tennis tournament in Latin Europe. It was the sixth WTA Tier I tournament of the year, and part of the European claycourt season. Lindsay Davenport and Natasha Zvereva were the defending champions, but only Zvereva participated this year with Mary Pierce. They were eliminated in the first round by Brie Rippner and Tara Snyder.

The French team of Alexandra Fusai and Nathalie Tauziat won their first Tier I title as a team, defeating Jana Novotná and Patricia Tarabini in the final.

Seeds
The top four seeds received a bye into the second round.

Draw

Finals

Top half

Bottom half

Qualifying

Seeds

Qualifiers
  Germana Di Natale /  Flora Perfetti

Lucky losers
  Brie Rippner /  Tara Snyder

Qualifying draw

References
 1999 WTA German Open Women's Doubles Draw
 

WTA German Open
WTA German Open